Mikladalur, meaning "great valley or dale" is the largest of four villages on the northern Faroese island of Kalsoy in the municipality of Klaksvík. It is situated in a large U-shaped valley on the east coast of the island.

The town's stone church dates from 1856. A tunnel to Trøllanes to the north was completed in 1985.

Legend of the Selkie 

Mikladalur has a legend of a selkie/sealwoman. Seals were believed to be former humans who voluntarily sought death in the ocean. Once a year, on Twelfth Night, they were allowed to come on land, strip off their skins and amuse themselves as human beings, dancing and enjoying themselves.

A young farmer from Mikladalur once went to the beach to watch the selkies dance. There he sees a beautiful selkie maiden shedding her seal skin, and he is hit by an intense desire for her. He hides the skin, so that she cannot go back to sea at the end of the night, and confronts her, and forces her to marry him. The man kept her skin in a chest, and kept the key with him both day and night. Like this they lived for several years, having several children together. One day when out fishing, he discovers that he has forgotten to bring his key, and rows back home with his power. When he returns home, his wife has escaped back to sea, leaving their children behind, but has put out the fire and hid away any sharp objects, so that they wouldn't be harmed.

Then one day it happened that the Mikladalur men planned to go deep into one of the caverns along the far coast to hunt the seals that lived there. The night before they were due to go, the man’s seal wife appeared to him in a dream and said that if he went on the seal hunt in the cavern, he should make sure he didn’t kill the great bull seal that would be lying at the entrance, for that was her husband. Nor should he harm the two seal pups deep inside the cave, for they were her two young sons, and she described their skins so he would know them. But the farmer didn’t heed the dream message. He joined the others on the hunt, and they killed all the seals they could lay their hands on. When they got back home, the catch was divided up, and for his share the farmer received the large bull seal and both the front and the hind flippers of the two young pups.

In the evening, when the head of the large seal and the limbs of the small ones had been cooked for dinner, there was a great crash in the smoke-room, and the seal woman appeared in the form of a terrifying troll; she sniffed at the food in the troughs and cried the curse: ‘Here lie the head of my husband with his broad nostrils, the hand of Hárek and the foot of Fredrik! Now there shall be revenge, revenge on the men of Mikladalur, and some will die at sea and others fall from the mountain tops, until there be as many dead as can link hands all round the shores of the isle of Kalsoy!’

When she had pronounced these words, she vanished with a great crash of thunder and was never seen again. But still today, alas, it so happens from time to time that men from the village of Mikladalur get drowned at sea or fall from the tops of cliffs; it must therefore be feared that the number of victims is not yet great enough for all the dead to link hands around the whole island of Kalsoy.

There stands a statue of the selkie, down at the shore amidst the crashing surf in Mikladalur.

See also
 List of towns in the Faroe Islands

References

External links

A Danish website including several photographs of Mikladalur
Stats - Hagstova

Populated places in the Faroe Islands